Al Hashemi is a United Arab Emirates-based architectural firm. It designed the HHHR Tower in Dubai, a supertall skyscraper completed in 2009.

External links
 Official website
 Emporis profile

Architecture firms of the United Arab Emirates